Paasilinna is a Finnish surname meaning "stone-made stronghold" or "stone fortress". Notable people with the surname include:

Arto Paasilinna (1942–2018), Finnish writer
Erno Paasilinna (1935–2000), Finnish writer
Reino Paasilinna (1939–2022), Finnish politician

Finnish-language surnames